Boljare is a village located in the municipality of Sjenica, Serbia. According to the 2011 census, the village has a population of 33 inhabitants. A border crossing between Serbia and Montenegro in planned to be constructed in the village as part of A2 motorway.

References

Populated places in Zlatibor District
Sjenica